Volume IV: The Lions of Love is the fourth album by the Canadian indie rock band Two-Minute Miracles, produced by frontman Andy Magoffin.  It was released in 2007 on Weewerk.

Track listing
All songs were written by Two-Minute Miracles.
 "The Minus Ball"
 "Put It Out"
 "Conjoined"
 "Night Of Rain"
 "The Bee Hell"
 "No Fairway"
 "The Lions of Love"
 "Unusual Romance"
 "Since We Were Married"
 "In a Good Light"
 "Stay Off the Train Tracks"
 "Small Face"
 "Start Your Own Goddam Band"
 "Salsateria"
 "Freeloading Is Hot"
 "Don’t Come Knocking"

Personnel 
 The Two-Minute Miracles
Andy Magoffin – vocals, guitars
 Michael Cristoff – piano
 Aaron Curtis – drums
 Greg Smith – bass guitar
Justin Nace – guitar
 Guest musicians
 Jenny Mitchell
 Clay Corneil

References

External links 
 Interview with Andy Magoffin in Chart about the album

The Two-Minute Miracles albums
2007 albums
Sequel albums